The Honduras Air Force (sometimes abbreviated to FAH in English) is the air force of Honduras.  As such it is the air power arm of the Honduras Armed Forces.

History
The first Honduras military flying took place on 18 April 1921 in a Bristol F.2b Fighter biplane flown by an American contracted pilot, while in 1923 the first government flying school was founded with the assistance of Italian investors.

During World War II it fought against the Axis powers, between 1942 and 1944 performing anti-submarine patrols along its Caribbean coastline.

After the war the HAF re-equipped with aircraft from United States Army Air Forces and Royal Canadian Air Force stocks including five Lockheed P-38 Lightnings and five Bell P-63 Kingcobras which were its first high performance fighters. Honduras ratified the Inter-American Treaty of Reciprocal Assistance in 1947, and within the next 10 years the United States supplied new aircraft including 19 Vought F4U Corsair fighter bombers, several Douglas C-47 Skytrain transports, and six North American AT-6C armed- and six T-6G advanced trainers.

In 1969 Honduras fought the one week long Football War with El Salvador. The HAF managed to successfully bomb the Salvadorean fuel supplies at Acajutla and Cutuco and fight the enemy's air force out of the sky. Later it provided close air support to the Honduras Army. After the cease fire, both countries tried unsuccessfully to acquire their first jets to replace their old propeller-driven aircraft.

The political climate eventually changed and by the mid-1970s the HAF re-equipped with 10 old ex-Yugoslav Canadair CL-13 Mk.4 Sabre, 16 ex-Israeli Dassault Super Mystère B2 and six new Cessna A-37B Dragonfly Counter-insurgency jets; plus several Bell UH-1B and UH-1H Huey Iroquois assault helicopters. The HAF was also reorganized, several new air bases were created and its name changed to  only. These airplanes were used during the 1980s confrontation with the Sandinista government of Nicaragua.

Later that decade these were augmented or replaced with 11 ex-USAF OA/A-37B Dragonflies, 12 ex-USAF Northrop F-5E/F Tiger II interceptors, 12 new Embraer T-27 Tucano armed trainers and four new CASA 101BB-02 attack airplanes. They are supported with five ex-USAF Lockheed C-130A Hercules transports, five armed MD500D and 10 new Bell 412SP utility helicopters, which are all in use to this day.

In October 2014 Honduras received an Embraer Legacy 600, 16-seat VIP transport aircraft, which was valued at US$14 million. This aircraft (FAH-001) arrived at Toncontín airport on 15 October and was donated to the Honduras Air Force (Fuerza Aérea Hondureña, or FAH) by Taiwan. The VIP aircraft would also be available for medical evacuation in case of an emergency. Plans to buy two new Brazilian Embraer EMB-314 Super Tucano light fighters were also announced by the Honduran Foreign Ministry.

Bases 
The FAH operates from four air bases at Tegucigalpa, Comayagua, San Pedro Sula, and La Ceiba. Additionally, three air stations located at Catacamas, Alto Aguán (bomb range) and Puerto Lempira airstrips serve as forward operations locations-FOL. Also a radar station operates at La Mole peak. All bases operates as dual civil and military aviation facilities. Comayagua is home to the Air Force Academy (Academia Militar de Aviación de Honduras Capitán Raúl Roberto Barahona Lagos).

Aircraft

Current inventory

References

Bibliography
Hagedorn, Daniel P. "From Caudillos to COIN". Air Enthusiast, Thirty-one, July–November 1986. pp. 55–70. .

Hoyle, Craig. "World Air Forces Directory". Flight International, Vol. 194, Number 5665, 4–10 December 2018. . pp. 32–60.

External links

Official Honduras Air Force pages 
Official Honduras Air Force Academy page 
Honduras Air Arms - Scramble.nl
Aeroflight - Honduran Air Force

Air forces by country
Military of Honduras
Aviation in Honduras
1931 establishments in Honduras